The Morel River originates in the hills near Dharla and Chainpura villages in Bassi Tehsil of Jaipur District (one branch), second branch makes by receiving water from the catchment area of foothills of Paplaj Mataji mountains, district Dausa, Rajasthan (Aravali mountain series).  

It flows southeast for 29 km, then southwest for 35 km, up to the confluence with river Dhund, and then southeast for 83 km in Jaipur, Dausa and Sawai Madhopur Districts, before joining Banas river near Hadoli of Sawai Madhopur District. Major part of Morel river flows in District Dausa and Sawai Madhopur of state Rajasthan. Dausa, Lawan and Lalsot tehsils are the tehsil areas of Dausa District which contribute as major part of its water catchment area and flow route.

Major villages such as Kaluwas, Mohammedpura, Bilka, Ranoli etc. are situated on the bank of this river. Civilization of these villages is very old and this great river was called as life line of these civilizations. The village Kaluwas was situated earlier on the bank of this river but after heavy flood, the village was shifted about one kilometer away. It makes 10km boundary between Jaipur and Dausa district. It divides the two villages Badi Jhanpda Kalan Mandya Ki Dhani (Chaksu) and Choti Jhanpda Kalana(lalsot) of Jaipur and Dausa. After that its subsidiary Dhund river meets in Sammel village then both make a big dam in Morel area dam in Dausa Sawai Madhopur district . Then the Morel river meets in Banas river in Karoli district. 

The Morel river is the main important part of the eastern Rajasthan canal project which aims to join almost 12 districts of eastern Rajasthan by 2050.
 

Rivers of Rajasthan
Rivers of India